Claude Burdin (19 March 1788 – 12 November 1873) was a French engineer.
Born in Lépin-le-Lac, Savoie, when it was known as the Duchy of Savoy, he was professor at the school of mines, École nationale supérieure des mines de Saint-Étienne, in Saint-Étienne.
He became a French citizen on 4 June 1817. He proposed the concept and developed the term turbine from the Greek word τύρβη, meaning "whirling" or a "vortex".

Biography
Burdin was born on 19 March 1788 in the Duchy of Savoy. He was part of the class 1807 of the École polytechnique and the École nationale supérieure des mines de Paris. He became a professor at the École nationale supérieure des mines de Saint-Étienne. Burdin spent most of his engineering career in Clermont-Ferrand.

In 1822, Burdin submitted his memo "Des turbines hydrauliques ou machines rotatoires à grande vitesse" (Hydraulic turbines or high-speed rotary machines) to the Académie royale des sciences in Paris. However, it was not until 1824 that a committee of the Académie (composed of Prony, Dupin, and Girard) reported favorably on Burdin's memo.

Working on water wheels, he was the promoter and creator of the first modern water turbine, an invention which was perfected by his pupil in Saint-Étienne, Benoît Fourneyron. This turbine - with a vertical axis - was installed in 1825 in a mill located in Pontgibaud; it had an energy efficiency of 67%.

He became a corresponding member of the Académie de Savoie on 4 July 1834 and of the Académie des sciences in 1842.

References

Sources

External links
 Extract of "Le corps des mines aux XIXe et au XXe siècles", 

1788 births
1873 deaths
École Polytechnique alumni
French engineers
Members of the French Academy of Sciences
Recipients of the Legion of Honour